The Barry Railway class H was a small class of seven 0-8-2T tank locomotives built for the Barry Railway by Sharp Stewart in 1896. When they were introduced they were the first locomotives in Britain to use the 0-8-2 wheel arrangement.

History
The genesis of the class was in the four earlier Class D 0-8-0 tender locomotives. These had been purchased from Sharp, Stewart and Company, who had originally built them for the Swedish & Norwegian Railway. One attractive feature of these locomotives had been their short overall length, due to their diminutive four-wheeled tenders. This made them unusually short for their power, suitable for the Barry Railway's restrictively short turntables, and their resultant limited range was not an issue for the short journeys of the Welsh mineral traffic.

When the Barry Railway had need of more locomotives for coal trains on the Vale of Glamorgan Line it returned to Sharp Stewart, who had also supplied most of the locos on the railway, for similar engines to the Class D. The result was the Class H 0-8-2T, which had the same small driving wheels to give a high tractive effort, and were heavy (for the time) giving good braking. They were built as tank locomotives, with an additional rear pony truck, which allowed a coal and water capacity greater than that of the small Class D tender, whilst also being shorter and not requiring the use of turntables. Seven locomotives were delivered in 1896, and numbered 79–85, the numbers being carried on an oval plate attached to the side tanks. Once delivered however, the Class H locos were employed in hauling heavy coal trains between Barry Docks and the large yard at Cadoxton, and in this way they spent their working lives.

With the grouping in 1922, the Barry Railway became part of the Great Western Railway which renumbered the locos 1380–1386, placing the new numbers on the bunker behind the cab door, and designating them 1380 class in the GWR records. Improvements were made to numbers 1380 and 1383 at Swindon Works including GW pattern safety bonnets, enlarged bunkers, new buffers and an extended smokebox, the changes adding an extra ton to the loco weight. Despite this the locos were non-standard in GWR terms, and were all scrapped between 1925 and 1930.

References 

H
0-8-2T locomotives
Sharp Stewart locomotives
Railway locomotives introduced in 1896
Scrapped locomotives
Standard gauge steam locomotives of Great Britain

Freight locomotives